= University Arena =

University Arena may refer to:

- University Arena (Western Michigan University), basketball and volleyball arena at Western Michigan University
- University Arena (Limerick), sports complex at the University of Limerick
- University Arena, former name of The Pit at the University of New Mexico
